The Gloucestershire Police and Crime Commissioner is the police and crime commissioner, an elected official tasked with setting out the way crime is tackled by Gloucestershire Police in the English County of Gloucestershire. The post was created in November 2012, following an election held on 15 November 2012, and replaced the Gloucestershire Police Authority. The current incumbent is Conservative Chris Nelson.

List of Gloucestershire Police and Crime Commissioners

References

Police and crime commissioners in England